Fear Is The Weapon is a compilation album from American metal band Tombs. The compilation includes tracks off of their self-titled EP, split EP, and demos from the Winter Hour sessions. It was released through Relapse Records on November 2, 2010 in CD and digital download formats. The CD release was limited to 1,000 copies.

Track listing

Personnel
Tombs
 Mike Hill - vocals and guitar
 Dominic Seita - bass (tracks 1-7)
 Carson Daniel James - bass (tracks 8-14)
 Justin Ennis - drums
Additional musicians
 Josh Graham - guitar on Marina
 April Goettle - vocals on Chevel Nor
Production
 Mike Hill - audio mixing and production
 Graham Goldman - mastering
Art
 Ryan Begley - album artwork
 Jacob Speis - addition album artwork, layout

External links

References

2010 albums
Compilation albums by American artists
Relapse Records albums
Tombs (band) albums